Pouebo symmetricauda is a species of fly belonging to the family Dolichopodidae. It is the only member of the genus Pouebo, and was described from New Caledonia.

References

Sciapodinae
Insects of New Caledonia
Insects described in 2008
Endemic fauna of New Caledonia